Samuel Karlin (June 8, 1924 – December 18, 2007) was an American mathematician at Stanford University in the late 20th century.

Biography
Karlin was born in Janów, Poland and immigrated to Chicago as a child. Raised in an Orthodox Jewish household, Karlin became an atheist in his teenage years and remained an atheist for the rest of his life. Later in life he told his three children, who all became scientists, that walking down the street without a yarmulke on his head for the first time was a milestone in his life.

Karlin earned his undergraduate degree from Illinois Institute of Technology; and then his doctorate in mathematics from Princeton University in 1947 (at the age of 22) under the supervision of Salomon Bochner. He was on the faculty of Caltech from 1948 to 1956, before becoming a professor of mathematics and statistics at Stanford.

Throughout his career, Karlin made fundamental contributions to the fields of mathematical economics, bioinformatics, game theory, evolutionary theory, biomolecular sequence analysis, and total positivity. He did extensive work in mathematical population genetics.  In the early 1990s, Karlin and Stephen Altschul developed the Karlin-Altschul statistics, a basis for the highly used sequence similarity software program BLAST.

Karlin authored ten books and more than 450 articles. Karlin was a member of the American Academy of Arts and Sciences, the National Academy of Sciences, and the American Philosophical Society. He won a Lester R. Ford Award in 1973. In 1989, President George H. W. Bush bestowed Karlin the National Medal of Science "for his broad and remarkable research in mathematical analysis, probability theory and mathematical statistics, and in the application of these ideas to mathematical economics, mechanics, and population genetics." He was elected to the 2002 class of Fellows of the Institute for Operations Research and the Management Sciences.

One of his sons, Kenneth D. Karlin, is a professor of chemistry at Johns Hopkins University and the 2009 winner of the American Chemical Society's F. Albert Cotton Award for Synthetic Chemistry. His other son, Manuel, is a physician in Portland, Oregon. His daughter, Anna R. Karlin, is a theoretical computer scientist, the Microsoft Professor of Computer Science & Engineering at the University of Washington.

Selected publications
 
 
 S. Karlin and H. M. Taylor. A First Course in Stochastic Processes.  Academic Press, 1975 (second edition).
 S. Karlin and H. M. Taylor. A Second Course in Stochastic Processes.  Academic Press, 1981.
 S. Karlin and H. M. Taylor. An Introduction to Stochastic Modeling, Third Edition. Academic Press, 1998. 
 S. Karlin, D. Eisenberg, and R. Altman. Bioinformatics: Unsolved Problems and Challenges. National Academic Press Inc., 2005. .
 S. Karlin (Ed.). Econometrics, Time Series, and Multivariate Statistics. Academic Press, 1983. .
 S. Karlin (Author) and E. Nevo (Editor). Evolutionary Processes and Theory. Academic Press, 1986. .
 S. Karlin. Mathematical Methods and Theory in Games, Programming, and Economics. Dover Publications, 1992. .
 S. Karlin and E. Nevo (Eds.). Population Genetics and Ecology. Academic Press, 1976. .
 S. Karlin and W. J. Studden. Tchebycheff systems: With applications in analysis and statistics (pure and applied mathematics). Interscience Publishers, 1966 (1st edition). ASIN B0006BNV2C.
 S Karlin and S. Lessard. Theoretical Studies on Sex Ratio Evolution. Princeton University Press, 1986. 
 S. Karlin. Theory of Infinite Games. Addison Wesley Longman Ltd. Inc., 1959. ASIN B000SNID12.
 S. Karlin. Total Positivity, Vol. 1. Stanford, 1968. ASIN B000LZG0Xu.

See also
Karlin–McGregor polynomials

References

External links 
 "Math in the News: Mathematician Sam Karlin, Known for Contributions in Computational Biology, has Died." Math Gateway of the Mathematical Association of America, February 5, 2008.
 
 
 
 Obituary,  I.M.S. Bulletin, May 2008
 Biography of Samuel Karlin from the Institute for Operations Research and the Management Sciences

National Medal of Science laureates
Members of the United States National Academy of Sciences
Fellows of the American Academy of Arts and Sciences
Fellows of the Institute for Operations Research and the Management Sciences
John von Neumann Theory Prize winners
American geneticists
Probability theorists
American operations researchers
Game theorists
Mathematical economists
Functional analysts
20th-century American mathematicians
Stanford University Department of Mathematics faculty
Stanford University Department of Statistics faculty
Princeton University alumni
Illinois Institute of Technology alumni
Jewish American atheists
American people of Polish-Jewish descent
Polish emigrants to the United States
1924 births
2007 deaths
Members of the American Philosophical Society